Bent Dideriksen (born 16 July 1931) is a Danish footballer. He played in two matches for the Denmark national football team in 1957.

References

External links
 
 

1931 births
Living people
Danish men's footballers
Denmark international footballers
Sportspeople from Region Zealand
Association football forwards
Næstved Boldklub players